The Progressive Populist is a magazine in tabloid newspaper format published twice monthly. Founded in 1995, the magazine is based in Storm Lake, Iowa, with editorial offices in Manchaca, Texas. The editor is James M. Cullen, managing editor is Art Cullen and the publisher is John Cullen.

The magazine labels itself as "A Journal from America's Heartland." It deals with political and economic topics of interest to "workers, small businesses, and family farmers and ranchers"; according to its "About" page, the journal "report[s] on issues of interest to the middle class of America."

The magazine publishes original and syndicated columns of progressive journalists and pundits. 

From October 31, 2010, to February 2, 2012, The Progressive Populist had a partnership with Vicki Nikolaidis to produce an Internet radio show via Blogtalkradio. For the first two editions of the program, held on October 31 and November 11, the show was called The Progressive Politics Show and was hosted on Asnycnow Radio One. The show was renamed Talking Progressive Politics and moved to the Populist'''s BTR service since November 17, 2010.   The final show associated with the Populist aired on January 5, 2012, and the show continued until its final broadcast on February 2, 2012. The show has since been canceled. All past broadcasts have been pulled from Blogtalkradio and Vicki Nikolaidis has moved on to the Politics Daily'' show with BostonRed.

References

External links 
 Official site
 The Progressive Populist Blog
 Former show page at Asnycnow Radio

Alternative magazines
Bimonthly magazines published in the United States
Business magazines published in the United States
Magazines established in 1995
Magazines published in Iowa
Political magazines published in the United States
Populism